2013 in sport wrestling:

 2013 World Wrestling Championships
 Belt wrestling at the 2013 Summer Universiade
 Wrestling at the 2013 Summer Universiade
 2013 Asian Wrestling Championships
 2013 European Wrestling Championships
 Wrestling at the 2013 Mediterranean Games
 Wrestling at the 2013 Canada Summer Games

 
 
Wrestling